Lisān al-ʿArab (لسان العرب, "Tongue of Arabs") is a dictionary of Arabic completed by Ibn Manzur in 1290.

History 

Ibn Manzur's objective in this project was to reïndex and reproduce the contents of previous works to facilitate readers' use of and access to them. In his introduction to the book, he writes:"وليس في هذا الكتاب فضيلة أمت بها، ولا وسيلة أتمسك بسببها سوى أني جمعت فيه ما تفرق في تلك الكتب من العلوم (…) وما تصرفت فيه بكلام غير ما فيها من النص، فليتقيد من ينقل عن كتابي هذا أنه ينقل عن هذه الأصول الخمسة"
"In this book there is nothing unprecedented, nor is there a particular methodology I hold other than that I gathered what had been dispersed in those academic books... I did not include any other text, so let anyone who cites my book understand that he is citing these five original sources.Occupying 20 printed book volumes (in the most frequently cited edition), it is the best known dictionary of the Arabic language, as well as one of the most comprehensive. Ibn Manzur compiled it from other sources to a large degree. It follows the Ṣiḥāḥ in the arrangement of the roots: The headwords are not arranged by the alphabetical order of the radicals as usually done today in the study of Semitic languages, but according to the last radical  - which makes finding rhyming endings significantly easier. Furthermore, the Lisān al-Arab notes its direct sources, but not or seldom their sources, making it hard to trace the linguistic history of certain words. Murtaḍá al-Zabīdī corrected this in his Tāj al-ʿArūs, that itself goes back to the Lisān. The Lisān, according to Ignatius d'Ohsson, was already printed in the 18th century in Istanbul, thus fairly early for the Islamic world.

Published editions of the Lisān al-'Arab 
 Bullag Misr al-Matb'ah al-Kubra al-'Amiriyah Egypt; 1883, vol.,1
 Al-Maṭbaʿa al-Kubra al-Amirīya, Bulaq; 1883 - 1890, vols.,20
 Dar Sadir, Beirut; 1955 - 1956, vols.,15.
 Ādāb al-Ḥawza, Iran; 1984, vols.,18

References 

Arabic dictionaries
13th-century books
Amiri Press publications
1290 books
13th-century encyclopedias
Arabic non-fiction books